Alice Dunbar Nelson (July 19, 1875 – September 18, 1935) was an American poet, journalist, and political activist. Among the first generation born free in the South after the Civil War, she was one of the prominent African Americans involved in the artistic flourishing of the Harlem Renaissance.  Her first husband was the poet Paul Laurence Dunbar. After his death, she married physician Henry A. Callis; and, lastly, was married to Robert J. Nelson, a poet and civil rights activist. She achieved prominence as a poet, author of short stories and dramas, newspaper columnist, activist for women's rights, and editor of two anthologies.

Life
Alice Ruth Moore was born in New Orleans on July 19, 1875, the daughter of a formerly enslaved African-American seamstress and a white seaman. Her parents, Patricia Wright and Joseph Moore, were middle-class and part of the city's multiracial Creole community.

Personal life 
Moore graduated from the teaching program at Straight University (later merged into Dillard University) in 1892 and worked as a teacher in the public school system of New Orleans at Old Marigny Elementary. Nelson lived in New Orleans for twenty-one years. During this time, she studied art and music, learning to play piano and cello.

In 1895, Alice Dunbar Nelson's first collection of short stories and poems, Violets and Other Tales, was published by The Monthly Review. Around this time, Moore moved to Boston and then New York City. She co-founded and taught at the White Rose Mission (White Rose Home for Girls) in Manhattan's San Juan Hill neighborhood, beginning a correspondence with the poet and journalist Paul Laurence Dunbar. Alice Dunbar Nelson's work in The Woman's Era captured Paul Laurence Dunbar's attention. On April 17, 1895, Paul Laurence Dunbar sent Alice a letter of introduction, which was the first of many letters that the two exchanged. In their letters, Paul asked Alice about her interest in the race question. She responded that she thought of her characters as "simple human beings", and believed that many writers focused on race too closely. Although her later race-focused writings would dispute this fact, Alice's opinion on the race problem contradicted Paul Laurence's. Despite contradictory opinions about the representation of race in literature, the two continued to communicate romantically through their letters.

Their correspondence revealed tensions about the sexual freedoms of men and women. Before their marriage, Paul told Alice that she kept him from "yielding to temptations", a clear reference to sexual liaisons. In a letter from March 6, 1896, Paul attempted to instigate jealousy in Alice by talking about a woman he had met in Paris. However, Alice failed to respond to these attempts and continued to maintain an emotional distance from Paul. In 1898, after corresponding for a few years, Alice ended up moving to Washington, DC to join Paul Laurence Dunbar and they secretly eloped in 1898. Their marriage proved stormy, exacerbated by Dunbar's declining health due to tuberculosis, alcoholism developed from doctor-prescribed whiskey consumption, and depression. Before their marriage, Paul raped Alice, which he later blamed on his alcoholism. Alice would later forgive him for this behavior. Paul would often beat Alice, which was public knowledge. In a later message to Dunbar's earliest biographer, Alice said, "He came home one night in a beastly condition. I went to him to help him to bed—and he behaved as your informant said, disgracefully." She also claimed to have been "ill for weeks with peritonitis brought on by his kicks." In 1902, after he beat her nearly to death, she left him. He was reported to also have been disturbed by her lesbian affairs. The pair separated in 1902 but were never divorced before Paul Dunbar's death in 1906.

Alice then moved to Wilmington, Delaware and taught at Howard High School for more than a decade. During this period, she also taught summer sessions at State College for Colored Students (the predecessor of Delaware State University) and at the Hampton Institute. In 1907, she took a leave of absence from her Wilmington teaching position and enrolled at Cornell University, returning to Wilmington in 1908. 
In 1910, she married Henry A. Callis, a prominent physician and professor at Howard University, but this marriage ended in divorce.

In 1916 she married the poet and civil rights activist Robert J. Nelson. She worked with him to publish the play Masterpieces of Negro Experience (1914), which was only shown once at Howard High School in Wilmington. She joined him in becoming active in local and regional politics. They stayed together for the rest of their lives.

During this time she also had intimate relationships with women, including Howard High School principal Edwina Kruse and the activist Fay Jackson Robinson. In 1930, Nelson traveled throughout the country lecturing, covering thousands of miles and presenting at thirty-seven educational institutions. Nelson also spoke at YWCAs, YMCAs, and churches. Her achievements were documented by Friends Service Committee Newsletter.

Early activism 

At a young age, Alice Dunbar Nelson became interested in activities that would empower Black women. In 1894, she became a charter member of the Phillis Wheatley Club in New Orleans, contributing her writing skills. To expand their horizons, the Wheatley Club collaborated with the Woman's Era Club. She worked with the Woman's Era Club's monthly newspaper, The Woman's Era. Targeting refined and educated women, it was the first newspaper for and created by African-American women. Alice's work with the paper marked the beginning of her career as a journalist and an activist.

Dunbar-Nelson was an activist for African Americans' and women's rights, especially during the 1920s and 1930s. While she continued to write stories and poetry, she became more politically active in Wilmington, and put more effort into journalism on leading topics. In 1914, she co-founded the Equal Suffrage Study Club, and in 1915, she was a field organizer for the Middle Atlantic states for the woman's suffrage movement. In 1918, she was field representative for the Woman's Committee of the Council of Defense. In 1924, Dunbar-Nelson campaigned for the passage of the Dyer Anti-Lynching Bill, but the Southern Democratic block in Congress defeated it. During this time, Dunbar-Nelson worked in various ways to foster  political change. It is said, "She stayed very active in the NAACP; she cofounded a much-needed reform school in Delaware for African American girls; she worked for the American Friends Inter-Racial Peace Committee; she spoke at rallies against the sentencing of the Scottsboro defendants."

Journalism work and continued activism 
From 1913 to 1914, she was co-editor and writer for the A.M.E. Review, an influential church publication produced by the African Methodist Episcopal Church (AME Church). From 1920, she coedited the Wilmington Advocate, a progressive black newspaper.  She also published The Dunbar Speaker and Entertainer, a literary anthology for a black audience.

Alice Dunbar-Nelson supported America's involvement in World War I; she saw the war as a means to ending racial violence in America. She organized events to encourage other African Americans to support the war. She referenced the war in a number of her works. In her 1918 poem "I Sit and Sew", Nelson writes from the perspective of a woman who feels suppressed from engaging directly with the war effort. Because she was not able to enlist in the war herself, Nelson wrote propagandistic pieces such as Mine Eyes Have Seen (1918), a play that encouraged African American men to enlist in the army. These works display Nelson's belief that racial equality could be achieved through military service and sacrificing one's self to their nation.

From about 1920 on, she made a commitment to journalism and was a highly successful columnist, with articles, essays and reviews appearing as well in newspapers, magazines, and academic journals. She was a popular speaker and had an active schedule of lectures through these years. Her journalism career originally began with a rocky start. During the late 19th century, it was still unusual for women to work outside of the home, let alone an African-American woman, and journalism was a hostile, male-dominated field. In her diary, she spoke about the tribulations associated with the profession: "Damn bad luck I have with my pen. Some fate has decreed I shall never make money by it" (Diary, 366). She discusses being denied pay for her articles and issues she had with receiving proper recognition for her work.  In 1920, Nelson was removed from teaching at Howard High School for attending Social Justice Day on October 1 against the will of Principal Ray Wooten. Wooten states that Nelson was removed for "political activity" and incompatibility. Despite the backing of the Board of Education's Conwell Banton, who opposed Nelson's firing, Nelson decided not to return to Howard High School. In 1928, Nelson became Executive Secretary of the American Friends Inter-Racial Peace Committee. In 1928, Nelson also spoke on The American Negro Labor Congress Forum in Philadelphia. Nelson's topic was Inter-Racial Peace and its Relation to Labor. Dunbar-Nelson also wrote for the Washington Eagle, contributing "As In A Looking Glass" columns from 1926 to 1930.

Later life and death 
She moved from Delaware to Philadelphia in 1932, when her husband joined the Pennsylvania Athletic Commission. During this time, her health declined. She died from a heart ailment on September 18, 1935, at the age of 60. She was cremated in Philadelphia. She was made an honorary member of Delta Sigma Theta sorority. Her papers were collected by the University of Delaware.

Her diary, published in 1984, detailed her life during the years 1921 and 1926 to 1931 and provided useful insight into the lives of black women during this time. It "summarizes her position in an era during which law and custom limited access, expectations, and opportunities for black women." Her diary addressed issues such as family, friendship, sexuality, health, professional problems, travels, and often financial difficulties.

Rhetorical context
The rhetorical context of Alice Dunbar-Nelson's writing includes subject, purpose, audience, and occasion. Her work "addressed the issues that confronted African-Americans and women of her time". In essays such as "Negro Women in War Work" (1919), "Politics in Delaware" (1924), "Hysteria", and "Is It Time for Negro Colleges in the South to Be Put in the Hands of Negro Teachers?" Dunbar-Nelson explored the role of black women in the workforce, education, and the antilynching movement. The examples demonstrate a social activist role in her life. Dunbar-Nelson's writings express her belief of equality between the races and between men and women. She believed that African Americans should  have equal access to the educational institution, jobs, healthcare, transportation and other constitutionally granted rights. Her activism and support for certain racial and feminist causes started to appear around the early 1900s, where she publicly discussed the women's suffrage movement in the middle American states. in 1918, she officially held the role of field representative for the Woman's Committee of the Council of Defense, only a few years after marrying Robert J. Nelson who was a poet and a social activist as well. She significantly contributed to some African-American journalism such as the Wilmington Advocate and The Dunbar Speaker and Entertainer.  Following her leading role in the Woman's Committee, Alice became the executive secretary of the American friends inter-racial peace committee, which was then a highlight of her activism life. She successfully created a political/feminist career co-editing newspapers and essays that focused on the social issues that minorities and women were struggling through in American through the 1920s, and she was specifically influential due to her gain of an international supportive audience that she used to voice over her opinion.

Much of Dunbar-Nelson's writing was about the color line – both white and black color lines. In an autobiographical piece, "Brass Ankles Speaks", she discusses the difficulties she faced growing up mixed-race in Louisiana.  She recalls the isolation and the sensation of not belonging to or being accepted by either race.  As a child, she said, she was called a "half white nigger" and while adults were not as vicious with their name-calling, they were also not accepting of her.  Both black and white individuals rejected her for being "too white".  White coworkers did not think she was racial enough, and black coworkers did not think she was dark enough to work with her own people. She wrote that being multiracial was hard because "the 'yaller niggers,' the 'Brass Ankles' must bear the hatred of their own and the prejudice of the white race" ("Brass Ankles Speaks").  Much of Dunbar-Nelson's writing was rejected because she wrote about the color line, oppression, and themes of racism.  Few mainstream publications would publish her writing because it was not marketable. She was able to publish her writing, however, when the themes of racism and oppression were more subtle.

Summary section 
"I Sit and Sew" by Alice Dunbar-Nelson is a three stanza poem written 1918. In stanza one, the speaker addresses the endless task of sitting and sewing as opposed to engaging in activity that aids soldiers at war. In doing so, the speaker addresses issues of social norms and the expectation of women as domestic servants. As the poem continues into stanza two, the speaker continues to express the desire to venture beyond the confines of social exceptions by furthering the imagery of war as opposed to domestic duty, yet the speaker resolves the second stanza with the refrain of the first, "I must Sit and Sew". By doing so, the speaker amplifies the arresting realities of domestic duty attributed to womanhood in the 1900s. In the third and final stanza, the speaker further amplifies desire and passion by saying both the living and dead call for my help. The speaker ends by asking God, "must I sit and sew?" In doing so, the speaker appeals to heavenly intervention to further amplify the message within the poem.

Works
  Violets and Other Tales , Boston: Monthly Review, 1895. Short stories and poems, including "Titée", "A Carnival Jangle", and "Little Miss Sophie". Digital Schomburg. ("The Woman" reprinted in Margaret Busby (ed.), Daughters of Africa, 1992, pp. 161–163.)
 The Goodness of St. Rocque and Other Stories  , 1899, including "Titée" (revised), "Little Miss Sophie", and "A Carnival Jangle".
 "Wordsworth's Use of Milton's Description of the Building of Pandemonium", 1909, in Modern Language Notes.
 (As editor) Masterpieces of Negro Eloquence: The Best Speeches Delivered by the Negro from the days of Slavery to the Present Time, 1914.
 "People of Color in Louisiana", 1917, in Journal of Negro History.
 Mine Eyes Have Seen, 1918, one-act play, in The Crisis, journal of the National Association for the Advancement of Colored People (NAACP).
 (As editor) The Dunbar Speaker and Entertainer: Containing the Best Prose and Poetic Selections by and About the Negro Race, with Programs Arranged for Special Entertainments, 1920.
 "The Colored United States", 1924, The Messenger, literary and political magazine in NY
 "From a Woman's Point of View" ("Une Femme Dit"), 1926, column for the Pittsburgh Courier.
 "I Sit and I Sew", "Snow in October", and "Sonnet", in Countee Cullen (ed.), Caroling Dusk: An Anthology of Verse by Negro Poets, 1927.
 "As in a Looking Glass", 1926–1930, column for the Washington Eagle newspaper.
 "So It Seems to Alice Dunbar-Nelson", 1930, column for the Pittsburgh Courier.
 Various poems published in the NAACP's journal The Crisis, in Ebony and Topaz: A Collectanea (edited by Charles S. Johnson), and in Opportunity, the journal of the Urban League.
 Give Us Each Day: The Diary of Alice Dunbar-Nelson'', ed. Gloria T. Hull, New York: Norton, 1984.
"Writing, Citizenship, Alice Dunbar-Nelson". Zagarell, Sandra A. Legacy, Vol. 36, Iss. 2, (2019): 241–244.

References

External links

 
 
 
 Alice Dunbar-Nelson papers at Special Collections, University of Delaware Library
 About Alice Dunbar-Nelson, Department of English, College of LAS, University of Illinois, 1988
 Women of Color Women of Words biography Rutgers University
"I Am an American! The Activism and Authorship of Alice Dunbar-Nelson" (online exhibition) at The Rosenbach

1875 births
1935 deaths
American civil rights activists
African-American poets
African-American short story writers
LGBT women
American LGBT writers
LGBT African Americans
LGBT people from Louisiana
Women anthologists
Writers from New Orleans
Writers from Philadelphia
Straight University alumni
Cornell University alumni
American women poets
American women journalists
Delta Sigma Theta members
Harlem Renaissance
African-American women journalists
African-American journalists
American anti-lynching activists
Activists from Delaware
20th-century American women writers
19th-century American women writers
19th-century American poets
20th-century American poets
20th-century American journalists
19th-century American journalists
African-American suffragists
American suffragists
Editors of Delaware newspapers
Burials at Wilmington and Brandywine Cemetery
20th-century African-American women
20th-century African-American people
19th-century African-American writers
19th-century African-American women writers